King Christian IX Land is a coastal area of Southeastern Greenland in Sermersooq Municipality fronting the Denmark Strait and extending through the Arctic Circle from 65°N to 70°N.

History 
This area was named in September 1884 by Gustav Frederik Holm who claimed it for Denmark, naming it after the then-reigning Danish King Christian IX.

Geography 
King Christian IX Land is bordered by King Frederick VI Coast on the south, King Christian X Land and the Scoresby Sound to the north, and the Greenland Ice Sheet to the west. Greenland's highest mountain range, the Watkins Range, as well as the nearly as high Schweizerland are located in this region.

The shore area of King Christian IX Land includes the Blosseville Coast to the east. There are many fjords, the largest of which are Sermilik, Kangerlussuaq and Kangertittivatsiaq, as well as numerous coastal islands, including Ammassalik which is the site of the most populous town in Eastern Greenland, Tasiilaq.
On the coast itself there are some small settlements, such as Sermiligaaq, but areas far from the coast are uninhabited.

Image gallery

References

External links
Caledonian magmatic activity in south-eastern Greenland
Geography of Greenland